The ChaoJi connector, also referenced as CHAdeMO 3.0, is an ultra-high-power charging standard charging electric cars, released in 2020. The connector has a lemniscate shape (∞), with a flat bottom edge and is planned for charging battery electric vehicles at up to 900 kilowatts using direct current.  The design incorporates backward compatibility with CHAdeMO (used globally) and the GB/T DC-charging (used mainly in mainland China), using a dedicated inlet adapter for each system. The circuit interface of ChaoJi is also designed to be fully compatible with the Combined Charging System, also known as CCS (used mainly in Europe and North America).

A joint agreement between the CHAdeMO association and the China Electricity Council (with State Grid Corporation of China) was signed on 28 August 2018 after which the development was enlarged to a larger international community of experts.

Implementation
The new EVs implementing the standard are to be fitted with a female ChaoJi DC inlet, with a vehicle-side locking mechanism. This inlet can be co-sited in a "Combo" format underneath a GB/T-AC inlet (female), an SAE J1772 AC inlet (male), or 1‒3-phase AC Type 2 inlet (male).

For the charging infrastructure, DC fast-chargers would be fitted with the common ChaoJi male plug outlet and implement one or more variations of communication protocols:

 ChaoJi-1 operating under the GB/T protocol, for primary deployment in mainland China.
 ChaoJi-2 operating under the CHAdeMO 3.0 protocol, for primary deployment in Japan and other parts of the world.

Communication between the car and charger would use a CAN bus for both ChaoJi-1 and -2. A unified communication protocol based on Ethernet is also under consideration.

The connector is designed to be at least as strong as a CHAdeMO outlet.

Megawatt charging 

A new coupler codenamed  ‘Ultra-ChaoJi’ with an additional set of power pins above the standard ChaoJi pinouts, is currently under development. Ultra-ChaoJi is expected to be used by electrified heavy-duty vehicles (HDVs), airplanes and ships in the near future.

Etymology 
The reason for choosing such a name was multifactorial. Other than the reference to supercharging, the word ChaoJi itself sounds similar to "charger" and, like CHAdeMO, starts with "Cha".

References

Further reading

 

Electrical power connectors
DC power connectors
Plug-in hybrid vehicle industry
Charging stations
Automotive standards